Julia Maria Ragnarsson (born 30 July 1992) is a Swedish actress. She is the daughter of actor Lars-Göran Ragnarsson and stage director Karin Ragnarsson. She studied at Heleneholms gymnasium in Malmö 2008-11. She has acted in several television series and films like The Bridge, Maria Larssons eviga ögonblick, Stockholm Stories and Tillbaka till Bromma.

In 2016, she played the leading role as Olivia Rönning in the SVT crime series Springfloden.

Filmography
2003 – Tur & retur - My
2006 – Wallander – Den svaga punkten - Johanna
2008 – Wallander – Sidetracked (TV-series)
2008 – Maria Larssons eviga ögonblick - Anna Larsson 
2012 – The Fear (TV-series) - Zana
2013 – The Bridge – Laura (TV-series)
2014 – Steppeulven
2014 – Stockholm Stories
2014 – Tillbaka till Bromma
2015 – In the Sea (short)
2016 – Min faster i Sarajevo
2016 – Springfloden (TV-series), (Spring Tide)
2016 – Take Down
2017 – Jakten på tidskristallen (TV-series) (Christmas Calendar)
2019 – Midsommar - Inga
2019 – Fartblinda (TV-series) - Bea Farkas

References

External links

1992 births
Living people
21st-century Swedish actresses
People from Malmö